Leonardus "Leon" Fransiscus Emanuel Kantelberg (born 15 July 1978 in Eindhoven, Netherlands) is a retired football midfielder from the Netherlands. He currently plays as a futsal player for Club Futsal Eindhoven.

He also had a trial with Valletta FC in June 2009. Before joining Valletta on trial he used to play in the Netherlands for Eredivisie team VVV-Venlo.

Kantelberg has appeared for the Netherlands Antilles national football team in qualifying matches for the 2006 and 2010 FIFA World Cup.

References

External links

1978 births
Living people
Footballers from Eindhoven
Association football midfielders
Dutch Antillean footballers
Netherlands Antilles international footballers
FC Utrecht players
Helmond Sport players
VVV-Venlo players
FC Groningen players
SC Telstar players
FC Eindhoven players
Eredivisie players
Eerste Divisie players
Curaçao footballers